Josephine Cheesman (13 September 1910 – 18 November 1997) was a British painter. Her work was part of the painting event in the art competition at the 1948 Summer Olympics.

References

1910 births
1997 deaths
20th-century British painters
British women painters
Olympic competitors in art competitions
Artists from Dorset